Ishimine (written: 石嶺 or 伊志嶺) is a Japanese surname. Notable people with the surname include:

, Japanese singer-songwriter
, Japanese baseball player
, Japanese baseball player

Japanese-language surnames